SHiroil Government High School, Rajshahi is a secondary school in the Shiroil suburb of Rajshahi, Bangladesh. It was established in 1967. Its first principal was Mr. Riaj Uddin Ahmed.

Academic
There are 5 houses in SGHS to use different works.

Facilities
SGHS has a hostel facility, scout den, debate club, auditorium, mosque, library, and an athletic field.

See also
Government Laboratory High School Rajshahi
Rajshahi Collegiate School

References

Schools in Rajshahi District
High schools in Bangladesh